Spenger's Fresh Fish Grotto was a restaurant located in Berkeley, California at 1919 4th Street.  The restaurant was designated as a landmark in 2001 by the City of Berkeley.  A plaque was formally installed at the entrance to the restaurant in 2004.

Early years

Johann Spenger emigrated to California from Bavaria and settled in West Berkeley in the 1860s.  The original building housed Spenger's business and family residence. Johann Spenger worked as a hook and line fisherman on Lake Merritt in the early days.  The restaurant began as a clam stand in the 1890s. The menu originally included clam chowder, baked beans, fish dinners and ten-cent beer.

Expansion
Johann Spenger's son Frank Spenger (d. 1970) opened a full-service restaurant on the ground floor of the original building in the 1930s.  Eventually, dining rooms and bars were added as part of the expansion process as popularity of the restaurant grew.  Celebrities enjoyed dining at Spenger's along with local residents. Frank Spenger was also a fisherman.  Frank's son, Frank "Buddy" Spenger Jr. (19162003) was the family member who really made the restaurant famous.  He managed the business from 1940 through 1999. "By the 50s, Spenger's claimed to serve roughly 3,500 pounds of fish daily, more than any restaurant west of the Mississippi. For years it paid more in taxes to Berkeley than any other restaurant." At the age of 83, Buddy Spenger sold the business to McCormick & Schmick's a seafood restaurant chain based in Portland, Oregon.

Renovation
After the restaurant was sold to McCormick & Schmick's, the facility was closed for a year as it underwent a $5 million renovation.  Part of the renovation included replacing the original 1930s electrical system and retrofitting unreinforced brick walls with steel beams to comply with California's earthquake prevention standards.  The kitchen received the greatest attention during this process, as it was gutted and expanded with all new appliances.

Closure
The restaurant abruptly closed in October 2018, after 128 years of operations.

See also
 List of seafood restaurants

References

1890s establishments in California
2018 disestablishments in California
Buildings and structures in Berkeley, California
Defunct restaurants in California
Defunct seafood restaurants in the United States
History of Berkeley, California
Restaurants disestablished in 2018
Restaurants in Berkeley, California
Seafood restaurants in California